Sportswoman of the Year is the name of several awards:
 Sunday Times Sportswomen of the Year Awards
 Sports Illustrated's Sportsman of the Year award, if awarded to a woman